"Mr. Carter" is a song by American rapper Lil Wayne featuring fellow American rapper Jay-Z, released on July 1, 2008, as a promotional single from the former's sixth album Tha Carter III (2008). Produced by DJ Infamous and Drew Correa, the title refers to the two artists' shared surname (Dwayne Carter and Shawn Carter, respectively), although the two are not related. In the song, Wayne borrows lyrics from Jay-Z's song "Lucky Me", from his 1997 album In My Lifetime, Vol. 1. Lil Wayne had said that this track is his favorite from Tha Carter III.

Accolades
This song was nominated for Best Rap Performance by a Duo or Group at the 51st Grammy Awards.

Charts

Weekly charts

Year-end charts

Certifications

References

2008 singles
Cash Money Records singles
Lil Wayne songs
Jay-Z songs
Songs written by Jay-Z
Songs written by Lil Wayne
2008 songs
Songs written by Infamous (producer)